Adalhard II (c. 840 – 2 Jan (?) 890) was Count of Metz and Mozelgau. He was probably the son of Adalard the Seneschal.

Biography

Rule

Adalard is mentioned in documents from between the years 872 and 890 as Count in Metz and Mozelgau. Also in the years 878 to 890 he is referred to as the lay abbot of Echternach. On the basis of onomastics, and because before him this monastery was owned by Adalard the Seneschal, it is assumed that Adalard II is his son.

Marriage and children

His wife's name is listed as Adalarda in sources not mentioned. On the basis of onomastic data the historian  believes that his wife Adalarda was the daughter of Matfrida II, count of Ayfelgau. Their children were:

Stephen (d. aft. 900), Count of Chamonix and Bidgau
Gerhard (Gerard) I (c. 870/875 – 22 Jun 910), count of Metz from 890.
Matfried (d. 19 Aug c. 930), Count of Metz
Richert (Richer) (d. 23 Jul 945), abbot of Prüm 899, Bishop of Liège 920.

840s births
890 deaths